= List of canals in Isfahan =

As of 2023 Only 2 canals Niasarm and Farshadi remain in the city of Isfahan. There was an old network of hand dug water channels in the city of Isfahan guiding the river's water. Iranian government has effectively cut off Zayande Rud (Zayendeh River) which is the lifeline of canals. In 2023 some water was for the first time allocated by the government through pumping in order to preserve the madis. The government may deliver water by tank. Total of 308683 meters (310 kilometers) is length of canals in the central city of Isfahan

Region	Meters length	name of canal
District 1	18274	Tiran- Fadn- Dastgerd-Elyadarn- Jooy shah -Niasarm- Farshadi- Haji
2	23440	Partman- Shaams Abad-Valdan- Fardvan- Dastgerede- Ghomeysh
3	11252	Modares, Niasarm, Farshadi, Bagherkhan, Raran
4	22763	Windmill, Bagherkhan, Farshadi, Niasarm, Mehrabad, Furutan
5	13502	Shayj, Abdallahkhan, Nayj
6	2203	Radan Fizadan -Khonin
7	16076	Fadan–Farabi- Farsakh- Khonin- Barazande- Arzanan- Shahpasand
8	23980	Partman-Windmill Duborje, Sahel-Azadn–Taame-Ahangaran Tiran-Jalalie-Fadn-Yunart-Fardvan-Shahpasand-Shamsabad
9	76249	fadn–Farshadi-Haji-Ghomeysh-Karladan-Sahm-Tiran-Sudan-Rehnan-Elyadaran-Lanban
10	14146	Morghab-Haftoon- Spring Keshavarz- Spring Talar- Raran-Spring Safaie-Joharan
11	11095	Partman- Zohrabad-Kay Rehnan East- Rudab-Vaana-Sudan
12	2682	hadi gol-Mehdi abad
13	5654	miandoab- jalalan- Lat roghie-joy siah
14	15154	arazanan-dark- shahpasand-barazande
15	4223	Bagherkhan- Raran- Jooy Chehel Pars- Kay Andvan
Nazhvan	47990	Nayj- Shayj- Jalalan- Ghomeysh- Kardalan- Tiran- Windmill(Haji)- Farshadi- sahm -shah jooy- Fadn
